Utah State Route 129 may refer to:

 Utah State Route 129 (1931-1933), a former state highway from Moab to Castleton
 Utah State Route 129 (1933-1969), a former state highway near Milford
 Utah State Route 129 (1983-1989), a former state highway in Box Elder County
 Utah State Route 129, the modern route in Utah County

See also
 List of state highways in Utah
 List of highways numbered 129